Walther Wever (11 November 1887 – 3 June 1936) was a pre-World War II Luftwaffe Commander. He was an early proponent of the theory of strategic bombing as a means to wage war, while supporting the theories of Giulio Douhet. He died in an air crash in 1936.

Early life
Walther Wever was born on 11 November 1887 in Wilhelmsort in the county of Bromberg (now in Poland, then in East Prussia). He was the son of Arnold Wever, the one-time director of a Berlin bank and the grandson of the Prussian Prosecutor-General Dr. Carl George Wever. After his final secondary examinations, he settled in Schweidnitz where he trained as an officer.

Wever saw action in World War I and served as a staff officer for the OHL (Oberste Heeresleitung, Army High Command).

Luftwaffe
Wever became the Commander of the Reichsluftfahrtministerium on 1 September 1933. On 1 March 1935, he became Chief of Staff of the Luftwaffe shortly after its creation on 26 February 1935, a post he held until his death.
Wever was a supporter of the Strategic bomber and recognised its importance as early as 1934. He supported the aviation companies such as Junkers and Dornier, in their respective projects to produce the Ju 89 and Dornier Do 19 competitors for the Ural Bomber production contract competition.
Wever outlined five key points to air strategy:
1. To destroy the enemy air force by bombing its bases and aircraft factories, and defeating enemy air forces attacking German targets.2. To prevent the movement of large enemy ground forces to the decisive areas by destroying railways and roads, particularly bridges and tunnels, which are indispensable for the movement and supply of forces3. To support the operations of the army formations, independent of railways, i.e, armored forces and motorised forces, by impeding the enemy advance and participating directly in ground operations.4. To support naval operations by attacking naval bases, protecting Germany's naval bases and participating directly in naval battles5. To paralyze the enemy armed forces by stopping production in the armaments factories.

However, after his death, other strategists, like Ernst Udet and Hans Jeschonnek favored smaller aircraft as they did not expend as much material and manpower. They were proponents of the dive-bomber (Junkers Ju 87) and the doctrine of close support and destruction of the opposing air forces on the 'battle-ground' rather than through attacking enemy industry.
As a result, high-speed medium-bombers such as the Heinkel He 111, Dornier Do 17, and Junkers Ju 88 were developed, with much initial success. While some large strategic bomber programs were initiated, most notable the Ural Bomber project, which morphed into the He 177 Program, without a proponent of strategic bombing in the upper echelons of the Luftwaffe, the programs saw little progress, and would ultimately be developed too late into the war to have any meaningful effect. 

On 3 June 1936 Wever flew from Berlin to Dresden, to give a lecture at the Luftkriegsschule Klotzsche to a gathering of Luftwaffe cadets. When he received the news of the death of World War I German hero Karl Litzmann, he immediately set off for Berlin. On his return journey, the Heinkel He 70 Blitz that he was flying had not been properly examined during preflight checks, and the aileron gust locks were not removed. The aircraft was airborne when the wing dipped, and the Heinkel stalled and went into a horizontal cartwheel (akin to a ground loop, but at low altitude). It crashed and exploded in flames, killing Wever and his flight engineer. That same day, the RLM issued the Bomber A heavy bomber specification and design competition for what would become the Luftwaffe's only wartime heavy bomber in production and frontline service, the Heinkel He 177.

After Wever's death, a Luftwaffe bomber wing, Kampfgeschwader 4 General Wever was named after him, which fittingly enough in the later war years, would be equipped with and using in combat the one aircraft created for the design competition that started on the day of General Wever's death, the Heinkel He 177.
His son, also named Walther Wever, was a fighter pilot who was killed in action in April 1945.

Notes and citations

References 
 Corum, J.F. (1999). "Staerken und Schwaechen der Luftwaffe" in Mueller, R. & Volkmann, H.E. (Ed.) Die Wehrmacht: Mythos und Realitaet. Muenchen: Oldenbourg Verlag.
 Corum, James S. (1997). The Luftwaffe; Creating the Operational Air War 1918-1940. University Press of Kansas. 
 Griehl, Manfred & Dressel, Joachim. (1994) Bombers of the Luftwaffe. DAG Publications.

External links
The Ural bomber Concept: Wever's Dream

1887 births
1936 deaths
People from Bydgoszcz County
People from the Province of Posen
German Army personnel of World War I
Lieutenant generals of the Luftwaffe
People from the Province of Westphalia
Aviators killed in aviation accidents or incidents in Germany
Victims of aviation accidents or incidents in 1936
Prussian Army personnel
Luftwaffe pilots